Columbo may refer to an American detective television program or its titular main character.

Columbo may also refer to:

People 

 an alternative spelling of the common Italian surname Colombo
 Russ Columbo, an American singer, violinist and actor
 Franco Columbo, a Mexican professional wrestler.
 Chris Columbo, an American jazz drummer

Fictional characters 

 Mrs. Columbo, the titular character of the U.S. TV series Mrs. Columbo
 Columbo, a character in videogames Bust a Groove and Bust a Groove 2

Other uses 

 columbo (herb)
 "Columbo", 2017 song by the Austrian band Wanda
 Old spelling of Colombo, Sri Lanka

See also 

 Kolumbo (volcano), a large underwater volcano in the Aegean Sea
 
 
 Colombo (disambiguation)
 Columba (disambiguation)